Best, a compilation album by folk singer-songwriter Robert Earl Keen, released by Koch Records on November 7, 2006. The album features songs from six of Keen's previous albums: No Kinda Dancer, A Bigger Piece of Sky, No. 2 Live Dinner, Farm Fresh Onions, What I Really Mean, and Live at the Ryman: The Greatest Show Ever Been Gave.

Reception 
The AllMusic review by Mark Deming gave the album 3½ stars stating: "Robert Earl Keen is an archetypal Texas singer/songwriter, someone who can mine both laughter and tragedy from life along the dusty margins of life in the Lone Star State... a comprehensive and well-programmed compilation offering a fully rounded introduction to his music would be more than welcome. However, 2007's Best isn't quite that album... If you're looking for a concise, career-spanning overview of Robert Earl Keen's long career in music, Best isn't as much help as you might wish, but the consistent quality is a sure convincer."

Track listing
All tracks by Robert Earl Keen except where noted
"No Kinda Dancer" – 3:07
"Willie" – 2:36
"Armadillo Jackal" – 3:26
"Paint the Town Beige" – 4:34
"Whenever Kindness Fails" – 3:38
"Corpus Christi Bay" – 3:59
"Merry Christmas from the Family" – 3:54
"The Road Intro" – 5:08
"The Road Goes on Forever" – 7:45
"Furnace Fan" – 3:58
"All I Have Is Today" – 3:28
"Let the Music Play" (Keen, Bill Whitbeck) – 5:36
"For Love" – 4:24
"Mr. Wolf and Mama Bear" – 3:46
"Ride" – 3:45
"Feeling Good Again" – 3:15
"Gringo Honeymoon" – 4:53
"I'm Comin' Home" – 4:17

Personnel 

Robert Pool – Fender Bass
Dan Augustine – horn arrangements, trombone, tuba
Danny Barnes – banjo
Rich Brotherton – audio production, acoustic guitar, electric guitar, rhythm guitar, producer, vocal harmony
Nick Connolly – organ
Bryan Duckworth – fiddle
Dave Durocher – drums, vocal harmony, backing vocals
Joe Ely – pedal steel
Denice Franke – vocal harmony, vocals, backing vocals
Nanci Griffith – vocal harmony, backing vocals
Fred Gumaer – drums
John Hagen – cello
Melissa Story Haycraft – executive producer
Dan Huckabee – dobro
Robert Earl Keen Jr. – audio production, acoustic guitar, rhythm guitar, producer, vocals
Mike Landschoot – acoustic guitar, electric guitar
Randy LeRoy – mastering
Lyle Lovett – vocal harmony, backing vocals
Lloyd Maines – audio production, pedal steel, producer
George Marinelli – electric guitar, vocal harmony, backing vocals
Ian McLagan – organ
Eamon McLoughlin – fiddle, viola
Marty Muse – pedal steel
Riley Osborne – piano
Chuck Rhodes – production coordination
Phil Richey – trumpet
Elliott Rogers – backing vocals
Bill Schas – trombone
Michael Snow – bodhran, tenor banjo
Jay Spell – accordion
Tommy Spurlock – acoustic guitar, gut string guitar, lap steel guitar, pedal steel
Marty Stuart – mandolin
Paul Sweeney – mandolin
Garry Tallent – electric bass, upright bass
Tom Van Schaik – drums, percussion
Garry Velletri – audio production, producer
Bill Whitbeck – bass, electric bass
Elizabeth Yoon – art direction, design
Jonathan Yudkin – violin

References 

Robert Earl Keen albums
2006 greatest hits albums